Sir Basil Brooke, of Lubenham (died 12 November 1612) was an English MP for Leicestershire in 1607.

Basil Brooke of Lubenham was the son of Sir Andrew Brooke of Kirby, a Gentleman Usher to Queen Mary and the son of Thomas Brooke of Leighton. Basil succeeded his father in 1569.

He was appointed Escheator of Warwickshire and Leicestershire in 1597 and was a justice of the peace for Leicestershire from 1601 to at least 1608. He was knighted at the accession of James I in 1603 and served as High Sheriff of Leicestershire for 1605 (Feb to Nov).

He was elected knight of the shire for Leicestershire in a by-election on 28 May 1607 following the death of Sir Henry Beaumont, sitting until his death.

He died on 12 November 1612 and was buried at Lubenham. He had married Goodeth, the daughter of Sir William Feilding of Newnham Paddox, Warwickshire and had 3 sons, the eldest of which, Thomas, inherited Lubenham.

References

Year of birth missing
1612 deaths
English MPs 1604–1611
High Sheriffs of Leicestershire
Members of the Parliament of England for Leicestershire